Rosh yeshiva (pl. , ; Anglicized pl. rosh yeshivas) is the title given to the dean of a yeshiva, a Jewish educational institution that focuses on the study of traditional religious texts, primarily the Talmud and the Torah, and halakha (Jewish law). 

The general role of the rosh yeshiva is to oversee the Talmudic studies and practical matters. The rosh yeshiva will often give the highest shiur (class) and is also the one to decide whether to grant permission for students to undertake classes for rabbinical ordination, known as semicha.

The term is a compound of the Hebrew words rosh ("head") and yeshiva (a school of religious Jewish education). The rosh yeshiva is required to have a comprehensive knowledge of the Talmud and the ability to analyse and present new perspectives, called chidushim (novellae) verbally and often in print.

In some institutions, such as YU's Rabbi Isaac Elchanan Theological Seminary, the title of rosh yeshiva is given to many rabbis and the dean of the yeshiva is known as the rosh ha-yeshiva.

Role

The primary role of the rosh yeshiva is not simply to be the dean, but is generally to give the highest-level lecture in the yeshiva, which is usually a program of at least two years. Students who have studied in a yeshiva are generally known as "students of the Rosh Yeshiva", as their lecture is the one in which they usually attain their method of Talmudic analysis and critical reasoning, and this method is based on the particular style of that rosh yeshiva. 

In addition, since yeshivas play a central role in the life of certain communities within Orthodox Judaism, the position of rosh yeshiva is more than just the position within the yeshiva. A rosh yeshiva is often seen as a pillar of leadership in extended communities.

In Hasidic Judaism, the role of rosh yeshiva is secondary to the Rebbe, who is head of the Hasidic dynasty that controls it. In many Hasidic groups, the rosh yeshiva of a school will be the son or son-in-law of the rebbe, the assumed heir of the rebbe. However, the role that yeshivahs have within Hasidic communities is not nearly as important as it is in Lithuanian Jewish (Litvishe) communities. Hasidic students usually get married at the age of 18, which—in most cases—is the end of their yeshiva education. Students in the Lithuanian Jewish communities typically continue to study until they get married starting at around age 23, with the vast majority continuing their studies in a kollel after marriage. As a result, the role that a rosh yeshiva plays in Lithuanian Jewish communities is much more important than in the Hasidic ones.

History
Yeshivas continue the scholarly traditions of the sages of the Mishnah and Talmud who often headed academies with hundreds of students. In the Talmudic academies in Babylonia, the rosh yeshiva was referred to as the reish metivta ("head of the academy" in Aramaic) and had the title of gaon. Regard for the rosh yeshiva in many ways is the transplantation of Hasidic attitudes in the Lithuanian world.

Dynasties
Depending on the size of the yeshiva, there may be several rosh yeshivas, sometimes from one extended family. There are familial dynasties of rosh yeshivas, for example, the Soloveitchik, Finkel, Feinstein, Kotler, and Kook families, which head many yeshivas in the United States and Israel.

Famous rosh yeshivas
Prior to the Holocaust, most of the large yeshivas were based in Eastern Europe. Presently, the majority of the world's yeshivas and their rosh yeshivas are located in the United States and Israel.

The following is a list of some famous rosh yeshivas:

Rabbi Yaakov Ades
Rabbi Ezra Attiya
Rabbi Chaim Yehuda Leib Auerbach
Rabbi Shlomo Zalman Auerbach
Rabbi Leib Bakst
Rabbi Naftali Zvi Yehuda Berlin
Rabbi Avraham Yitzchak Bloch
Rabbi Moshe Mordechai Epstein
Rabbi Moshe Feinstein
Rabbi Eliezer Yehuda Finkel
Rabbi Nosson Tzvi Finkel 
Rabbi Chaim Flom
Rabbi Mordechai Gifter
Rabbi Refael Reuvain Grozovsky
Rabbi Chaim Yaakov Goldvicht
Rabbi Eliezer Gordon
Rabbi Nachman Shlomo Greenspan
Rabbi Shlomo Heiman
Rabbi Pinchas Hirschprung
Rabbi Yitzchok Hutner
Rabbi Yisrael Meir Kagan
Rabbi Yaakov Kamenetsky
Rabbi Abraham Isaac Kook
Rabbi Zvi Yehuda Kook
Rabbi Aharon Kotler
Rabbi Shneur Kotler
Rabbi Boruch Ber Leibowitz
 Rabbi Aharon Lichtenstein
 Rabbi Dov Linzer
 Rabbi Eliezer Melamed
 Rabbi Isser Zalman Meltzer
 Rabbi M.M. Minshky
 Rabbi Avigdor Nebenzahl
 Rabbi Avraham Yaakov Pam
 Rabbi Yisroel Yitzchok Piekarski
 Rabbi Shmuel Rozovsky
 Rabbi Yaakov Yitzchok Ruderman
 Rabbi Yisroel Salanter
 Rabbi Yechezkel Sarna
 Rabbi Hershel Schachter
 Rabbi Aaron Schechter
 Rabbi Gedalia Schorr
 Rabbi Elazar Shach
 Rabbi Moshe Shmuel Shapira
 Rabbi Meir Shapiro
 Rabbi Naftoli Shapiro
 Rabbi Shimon Shkop
 Rabbi Chaim Shmuelevitz
 Rabbi Joseph B. Soloveitchik
 Rabbi Adin Steinsaltz
 Rabbi Naftoli Trop
 Rabbi Chaim Volozhin
 Rabbi Elchonon Wasserman
 Rabbi Yechiel Yaakov Weinberg
 Rabbi Ezra Schochet

Rosh mesivta

The title rosh mesivta (alt. rosh metivta) has a long history, going back many centuries. The role is comparable to a dean in a university.

Mashgiach Ruchani

The personal and ethical development of the students in the yeshiva is usually covered by a different personality, known as the mashgiach or spiritual supervisor. This concept, introduced by the Mussar movement in the 19th century, led to perfection of character as one of the aims of attending a yeshiva. One typical and influential mashgiach was Rabbi Eliyahu Eliezer Dessler.

See
 Yeshivish
 List of yeshivos in Europe (before World War II)

References

 
Hebrew words and phrases
Jewish religious occupations
Orthodox rabbinic roles and titles